Bos Landen Golf Club is an 18-hole championship public course in Pella, Iowa. It was designed by architect Dick Phelps. Bos Landen ("Land of the Woods" in Dutch), reopened on June 8, 2009.

Awards 
Bos Landen has been ranked as Iowa's #1 Public Golf Course from 1997 to 2001 and was also ranked in the Top-75 Most Affordable Golf Courses in the United States (1999-2000) according to Golf Digest. Golf Digest also awarded Bos Landen with its "Four Star Place to Play - 2007" title. Each hole features 5 sets of tees for players of all skill levels, ranging from 5,100 to 7,000 yards in length.

Facilities 
In addition to the 18-hole course, Bos Landen also hosts a restaurant and conference facilities that seat up to 350 individuals.

References 

Golf clubs and courses in Iowa
Pella, Iowa